Kateh Shur (also Romanized as Kateh Shūr) is a village in Cham Rud Rural District, Bagh-e Bahadoran District, Lenjan County, Isfahan Province, Iran. At the 2006 census, its population was 427, in 104 families.

References 

Populated places in Lenjan County